20325 Julianoey, provisional designation , is a Vestian asteroid and a synchronous binary system from the inner regions of the asteroid belt, approximately  in diameter. It was discovered on 21 April 1998, by astronomers of the Spacewatch survey at Kitt Peak National Observatory near Tucson, Arizona. The asteroid was named after Australian photometrist Julian Oey. The discovery of its minor-planet moon was announced in December 2014.

Orbit and classification 

Julianoey is a member of the Vesta family, the second largest family in the asteroid belt, named after 4 Vesta. However, it is a non-family asteroid of the main belt's background population when applying the Hierarchical Clustering Method to its proper orbital elements.

It orbits the Sun in the inner asteroid belt at a distance of 2.2–2.6 AU once every 3 years and 8 months (1,340 days; semi-major axis of 2.38 AU). Its orbit has an eccentricity of 0.08 and an inclination of 6° with respect to the ecliptic. The body's observation arc begins with a precovery taken at Palomar Observatory in May 1954, almost 44 years prior to its official discovery observation at Kitt Peak.

Physical characteristics 

Julianoey is an assumed stony S-type asteroid.

Rotation period 

In December 2014, a rotational lightcurve of Julianoey was obtained from photometric observations by Donald Pray and several other astronomers across the world. Lightcurve analysis gave a well-defined rotation period of 3.24474 hours with a brightness amplitude of 0.13 magnitude.

Satellite 

The photometric observations from December 2014 also revealed that Julianoey is a synchronous binary asteroid with a minor-planet moon orbiting it every 23.54 hours. The satellite, provisionally designated , measures approximately 1.42 kilometers in diameter and its orbit has an estimated semi-major axis of 10 kilometers. The discovery was announced on 24 December 2014.

Diameter and albedo 

According to the survey carried out by the NEOWISE mission of NASA's Wide-field Infrared Survey Explorer, Julianoey measures 4.942 kilometers in diameter and its surface has a high albedo of 0.416. The Collaborative Asteroid Lightcurve Link assumes a standard albedo for stony asteroids of 0.20 and consequently calculates a larger diameter of 6.81 kilometers based on an absolute magnitude of 13.2.

Numbering and naming 

This minor planet was numbered on 9 January 2001. It was named after Julian Oey (born 1964), a well-known asteroid photometrist, observing from Australia. He was the principal investigator that led to the discovery of four binary asteroids: 2691 Sersic, 3868 Mendoza, 10208 Germanicus and 15268 Wendelinefroger.

The naming was suggested by astronomers Alan Harris and Petr Pravec. The official naming citation was published by the Minor Planet Center on 5 June 2016.

See also

References

External links 
 (20325) Julianoey at  Blue Mountains Observatory website
 Julian Oey, 2018 Shoemaker NEO Grant Recipients
 Asteroids with Satellites, Robert Johnston, johnstonsarchive.net
 Asteroid Lightcurve Database (LCDB), query form (info )
 Dictionary of Minor Planet Names, Google books
 Asteroids and comets rotation curves, CdR – Observatoire de Genève, Raoul Behrend
 Discovery Circumstances: Numbered Minor Planets (20001)-(25000) – Minor Planet Center
 
 

020325
020325
Named minor planets
020325
19980421